Daniel McVicar (born June 17, 1958; Independence, Missouri) is an American actor, director and writer known for his work in European Films and American Television.

Early life and education
McVicar was born in Missouri and raised in  Broomfield Colorado, United States. He studied at the California Institute of the Arts, the Stella Adler Studio, The Beverly Hills Playhouse and at the Royal Academy of Dramatic Arts, London.

Career
McVicar has a career spanning more than 40 years on television and film, with over 20 films to his credit. 

From 1987- 2009 he played fashion designer Clarke Garrison on The Bold and the Beautiful. He made 17 recurring appearances on The Late Late Show with Craig Ferguson, where he is Craig's nemesis at CBS Television City. He has made 17 recurring appearances on The Late Late Show with Craig Ferguson, where he was Craig's nemesis at CBS Television City.

He played Rock Hudson in the 1995 tv movie Liz: The Elizabeth Taylor Story.

He played Captain William T. Bell in "Maschi contro Femmine" (2010) directed by Fausto Brizzi

He starred opposite Ben Gazzara in two projects, the television miniseries Woman on the Run where he worked opposite screen legend Gina Lollobrigida, and A Kiss in the Dark with Gazarra and Patricia Millardet, as well as starring in Under the Sky for filmmaker Angelo Antonucci.

He was in The Fourth Planet, directed by award-winning Russian filmmaker Dimitris Astrakhan.  Although Daniel starred as American astronaut Sam Straiton, the role called for him to speak entirely in Russian, which he had to learn while shooting on location in St. Petersburg.

He appeared in two Ezio Greggio comedies, “Silence of the Hams”, and “Screw Loose”, working with Mel Brooks.

He is a member of Mensa.

He played the cult comic character Diabolik in the Tiromancino video clip “Amore Impossibile” alongside Claudia Gerini as Eva Kant.

In 2006, he released the short film "Always a First Time", which was directed, produced, and written by him. The film was named the best of the fest at the Salento Film Festival. He is also the creator of Late Night Mash, an award-winning show, and community. 

A former student of acting teachers Stella Adler, Lee Strasberg, and Milton Katselis and at the Royal Academy of Dramatic Art, he conducts Masterclasses at the International Cinema Academy in Milan.

The European years
Daniel relocated to Italy in 2007, and worked with Italian filmmakers Fausto Brizzi “Maschi Contro Femmine” (2010) , Giorgio Serafini “Il Bene e Il Male”, Giulio Manfredonia “Friends and Enemies”, The Manetti Bros “L’Ispettore Coliandro”, Paolo Ruffini “Fuga di Cervelli”,  and provided the voice for Davide Ferrario’s documentary “Sexxx”. 

He was cast in Polish director Jacek Bromski’s film “One Way Ticket to the Moon” playing Lt. Birnbaum.

He continued work in television, both in Variety programs such as “Treno di Desideri” and “I Raccomondati”, and appearing as a guest on shows hosted by Antonella Clerici, Mara Venier, Benedetta Parodi and Cristina Parodi, and others and has appeared in several television series.

He played a supercharged version of himself running a stunt school in a story arc on Fabio Volo’s television series “Untraditional”.

In 2022 he appeared in three films and a TV series: Massimo Paolucci’s “Soldato Sotto La Luna”,  Stefano Milla’s “The Magic Penguin”, “Oltre” and a story arc in the second season of “Sport Crime”.

He was President of the Inaugural Sorrento Film and Food Festival January 1-6 2023, with awards going to Terry Gilliam, Enrico Vanzina,  Noa, Susy Del Giudice and Giovanni Esposito, Remo Girone and Victoria Zinny, Francesca Tizzano and Master Chefs Don Alfonso, Peppe Aversa, Pasquale Palamaro and Gennaro Esposito.

New media 
McVicar started the McVlog video blog in July 2006 and hosted the first annual Vloggies Nov. 4, 2006.

His work in the new media expanded to "The Late Nite Mash", an online show and creative community that has featured interviews with Andy García, music mashups with The Late Nite Mash musical director Joey Altruda and saxophone player Plas Johnson, integrated with community generated content from animators, vloggers and artists.  Noteworthy episodes include a hangover remedy with French Maid Fifi and Freshtopia, and a discussion of the taser incident at UCLA with Mash experts Mistress Evolution and Mistress Abigail. He was named male vlogger of 2006 by Lulu.tv

His media company MagmaWave.com is in Los Angeles and Turin, Italy.

Personal 
Daniel McVicar is of Scottish, Irish and Polish ethnic descent. He is from a family of 12 siblings.  He is the father of three children, two from his first marriage (1987-1996), Hank McVicar (Born 1988- deceased 2011), Maisy McVicar (Born 1991) and Pietro McVicar (born 2012) from his marriage (2011-2014) to international figure skating judge Virginia De Agostini.

Selected filmography

Television

Film

Others

References

External links
 
 Daniel McVicar Official Site
 MagmaWave Media

American male television actors
American male soap opera actors
1958 births
Living people
Mensans